Arash is an administrative ward in the Ngorongoro District of the Arusha Region of Tanzania. According to the 2002 census, Arash has a total population of 8,503.

References

Wards of Ngorongoro District
Wards of Arusha Region
Ngorongoro District